The 2022 Suzuki Polish Basketball Cup was the 58th edition of Poland's national cup competition for men basketball teams. It is managed by the Polish Basketball League (PLK) and was held in Lublin, in the Globus.

Qualified teams
The eight participants qualified for the tournament after the first half of the 2021–22 PLK season. The highest-placed four teams would play the lowest-seeded teams in the quarter-finals. As host of the tournament, Start Lublin gained automatic qualification.

Bracket

Quarterfinals

Semifinals

Finals

See also
 2021–22 PLK season

References

External links
Official Site
Results page for 2021–22

Polish Basketball Cup
Cup